Francesco Vellani (1688–1768) was an Italian painter, active in Modena in a late Baroque style. He mainly painted sacred subjects.

He painted an altarpiece depicting the Assumption of the Virgin for the Cathedral of Modena; an Immaculate Conception for the main altar of the Chiesa Nuova; for the church of the Monache della Visitazione; a St Pius V and St Thomas Acquinas for the church of San Domenico; an altarpiece depicting St John of the Cross for the Church of the Monache Scalze in Modena.

Vellani also completed a number of fresco projects in Reggio Emilia including in The palaces Masdoni and Tirelli, as well as for the Oratory of San Spiridione.

References

1688 births
1768 deaths
17th-century Italian painters
Italian male painters
18th-century Italian painters
Painters from Modena
Italian Baroque painters
18th-century Italian male artists